Pulingome is a village in Kannur District of Kerala state, India.

Location
Pulingome is a village located in Cherupuzha Grama Panchayat, in the Kannur district in northern Kerala. Located between the Western Ghats and the Karnataka forest, It is 76 km away from Kannur and 37 km from Payyanur.

Demographics
As of 2011 Census, Pulingome village which spreads over an area of  had total population of 10,672 which 5,237 males and 5,435 females. Total number of households were 2,631 in the village limits. Population of children in the age group 0-6 was 1,014 (9.5%) where 518 are males and 496 are females. Pulingome village had overall literacy of 94% where male literacy was 95.4% and female literacy was 92.8%.

History
The name Pulingome is believed to be originated from a huge tamarind tree (Puli) located at the riverside on the way to nearby village Palavayal.

Pulingome was under the rule of Mushika dynasty of Ezhimala during the Sangha Age. Later, this became part of "Kolathunadu" under Chirakkal dynasty. Pulingome had a well established society and a rich culture all through its history. The ancient Sree Sankaranarayan temple here is believed to be set up by "Parasuram". The Pulingome Makham were two holy men of Islam, were buried some 1300 years ago and the remaining of a temple in the Karnataka forest near the border are examples of Pulingome’s cultural heritage. Later with the invasion of Tippu these regions were brought under Mysore kingdom and after Tippu’s death the region was under British rule. The Kamballur Kottayil Nambiar clan were the landlords of the Pulingome village and surrounding areas up until land reform in Kerala in the 1960s.

Institutions

 Pulingome Makhaam

The famous Pulingome Makham is in this village which is a holy shrine for Muslims. Muslim believers from different parts of Kerala especially from the neighbouring districts of Kasaragod, Kozhikode, Wayanad and from Karnataka state are visiting here for their spiritual Contentment. There is a yearly celebration called Pulingome Makham Uroos which will be participated by large number of people coming from different parts of Kerala and Karnataka. A peculiarity of the Mosque is that the landlord Kamballur Kottayil family (a Hindu Nambiar clan) is consulted even today before scheduling the Urs festivities. This is a testament to the age-old bond between the Mappilas of the area and the feudal Hindu families of the region.

 Kottathalachi Mount

It is located at around 2500 feet above the sea level. There is a Cross and a small shrine at the top of the hill. From Good Fridays onwards there is way of the cross offers talking to many. Cherupuzha - Pulingome - Kottathalachi is the shortest and most direct route to Mount Kottathalachi. 

 Sankaranarayana Temple- originally under the jurisdiction of the Kamballur Kottayil clan.
 St Joseph’s Church, Vazhakundam 
This Roman Catholic Church was built in 1954 by the Christians migrated from Central Travancore.

Transportation
The national highway passes through Perumba junction. Goa and Mumbai can be accessed on the northern side and Cochin and Thiruvananthapuram can be accessed on the southern side. The road to the east of Iritty connects to Mysore and Bangalore. The nearest railway station is Payyanur on Mangalore-Palakkad line. 
Trains are available to almost all parts of India subject to advance booking over the internet. There are airports at Kannur, Mangalore and Calicut. All of them are international airports but direct flights are available only to Middle Eastern countries.

References

Villages in Kannur district